Quiet Days in August (translit. Isyhes meres tou Avgoustou) is a 1991 Greek drama film directed by Pantelis Voulgaris. It was entered into the 41st Berlin International Film Festival.

Cast
 Aleka Paizi as Aleka
 Themis Bazaka as Elli
 Thanasis Veggos as Nikolas
 Chryssoula Diavati as Maria
 Alekos Oudinotis as Lefteris
 Eirini Inglesi as Eirini
 Mirka Kalatzopoulou as Vaso
 Nina Papazaphiropoulou
 Eirini Koumarianou
 Stavros Kalaroglou
 Tonia Stavropoulou
 Aglaia Pappa

References

External links

1991 films
Greek drama films
1990s Greek-language films
1991 drama films
Films directed by Pantelis Voulgaris
Films scored by Manos Hatzidakis